Huayllahuito (possibly from Aymara waylla Stipa obtusa, a kind of feather grass, wit'u spur,  "feather grass spur") is a mountain in the Vilcanota mountain range in the Andes of Peru, about  high. It lies in the Puno Region, Melgar Province, Nuñoa District, southeast of Pucaparina.

References

Mountains of Peru
Mountains of Puno Region